Oxynoemacheilus samanticus, the Kizilirmak sportive loach, is a species of ray-finned fish in the genus Oxynoemacheilus. It is found in streams and rivers with a fast current over gravel substrate and is endemic to eastern Anatolia, Turkey where it is found in the Kizilirmak system which drains into the Black Sea, as well as the headwaters of the Euphrates.

Footnotes 

samanticus
Endemic fauna of Turkey
Fish described in 1978
Taxa named by Petre Mihai Bănărescu
Taxa named by Teodor T. Nalbant